Castleton Four Corners is a census-designated place (CDP) in the town of Castleton, Rutland County, Vermont, United States. It consists of the unincorporated villages of Castleton Corners and Hydeville. As of the 2020 census, the CDP had a population of 699, out of 4,458 in the entire town.

The CDP is in northwestern Rutland County, in the southwest part of the town of Castleton. It is bordered to the east by Castleton village and to the west by the town of Fair Haven. Vermont Route 4A is the main road through the CDP; it leads east through Castleton village  to West Rutland and west  to Fair Haven village. Vermont Route 30 crosses Route 4A at Castleton Corners and leads north  to Middlebury and south  to Poultney. U.S. Route 4, a four-lane freeway, forms the northern edge of the CDP, with access from Exit 4 (Route 30). US 4 leads east  to Rutland and west  to Whitehall, New York.

The CDP is bordered to the south by the Castleton River, a west-flowing tributary of the Poultney River, which it joins at the New York state line on the west side of Fair Haven. The outlet of Lake Bomoseen, which flows south to the Castleton River, is in Hydeville. Castleton Four Corners is part of the Lake Champlain watershed.

References 

Populated places in Rutland County, Vermont
Census-designated places in Rutland County, Vermont
Census-designated places in Vermont